Ernst Zitelmann [tsi:tlman] (7 August 1852, Stettin – 28 November 1923, Bonn) was a German jurist who specialized in the dogmatics of civil law.

He studied law at the universities of Leipzig, Heidelberg and Bonn. In 1873, he got his dissertation at the university of Leipzig with the topic "Begriff und Wesen der juristischen Person" ("concept and constitution of a legal person").

Later on, he received great public attention by publishing an article on "Die juristische Willenserklärung" ("the juridical declaration of intent", 1878) and a monograph named "Irrtum und Rechtsgeschäft" ("error and act of legal significance", 1879). Because of that, he was nominated as an associate professor at the University of Göttingen in 1879. Some months later he went to the University of Rostock as a full professor.
 
He taught as a professor at the University of Rostock (1879-1881), University of Halle (1881-1884), University of Bonn (1884-1921). At Bonn, he taught classes in German civil law and Roman law".

Zitelmann died after an unsuccessful operation in 1923 in Bonn. In Bonn-Gronau, a street has been named after Zitelmann since 1929.

Literary works 
 Begriff und Wesen der juristischen Person, 1873
 Die juristische Willenserklärung, 1878
 Irrtum und Rechtsgeschäft, 1879
 Die Möglichkeit des Weltrechts, 1888
 Verschulden gegen sich selbst, 1900 (lost)
 Das Recht des Bürgerlichen Gesetzbuches, 1900
 Internationales Privatrecht, 2 vols., 1897–1912.
He was also the author of a book of prose poetry titled Radierungen und Momentaufnahmen (1903).

See also 
 Katharina Zitelmann (pseudonym: Katharina Rinhart), writer (December 26, 1844, Stettin - February 4, 1926, Berlin)

References and external links 
 Ebook Das Recht des Bürgerlichen Gesetzbuches, 1900 (hosted by Max Planck Institute for European History of Law in Frankfurt)

1852 births
1923 deaths
Lawyers from Szczecin
German jurists
People from the Province of Pomerania
University of Bonn alumni
Academic staff of the University of Bonn
Academic staff of the University of Göttingen
Academic staff of the Martin Luther University of Halle-Wittenberg
Heidelberg University alumni
Leipzig University alumni
Academic staff of the University of Rostock